The 2001 Grote Prijs Jef Scherens was the 35th edition of the Grote Prijs Jef Scherens cycle race and was held on 2 September 2001. The race started and finished in Leuven. The race was won by Niko Eeckhout.

General classification

References

2001
2001 in road cycling
2001 in Belgian sport